The Association of Theologically Trained Women of India (ATTWI) is an association of Indian women theologians which was constituted in 1979 in Chennai.

It is an ecumenical organisation with more than 500 members.

History
In 1977, Shanti Solomon and D. Hoeffer, a German missionary pioneered a conference for theologically trained women in Chennai with a three-fold purpose:
 to help the theologically trained women to explore ways and extend responsible participation in the total life and mission of the Church.
 to focus the attention of Churches on the presence of theologically trained women among them and to recognise their potential.
 to encourage theologically trained women to organise themselves into an all-India association to develop strategies for meeting their needs.

Another conference was organised in 1978 in Chennai.  In 1979, an ad hoc committee was constituted to draft a constitution for forming an association.

ATTWI became a reality in 1979.

Sessions, venue and topical sessions
Sessions, venue and topical sessions:
 1979 (20–22 February), Gurukul Lutheran Theological College & Research Institute, Chennai, Theologically Trained Women in India - Dare, Share and Act.
 1981 (3–6 February), Jeevan Jyothi Retreat Centre, Hyderabad, Theologically Trained Women of India - Called to Serve.
 1983 (26–30 May), Queen Victoria Girls Inter College, Agra, New Dimensions in the ministry.
 1985 (17–20 January), Charal Mount, Kerala, Feminist Theology in the West and Indian Church's Response.
 1987 (26–30 September), UMT College, Calcutta, Christian Home - the Nursery for Christian Concepts.
 1990 (8–11 February), Animation Centre, Bishop's House, Nagercoil, New Dawn for Women.
 1992 (23–26 October), Mecosabagh Girls Hostel, Nagpur, Theology - A Faith Experience.
 1997 (21–24 January), Operation Mobilisation Retreat Centre, Secunderabad, Theology - Praxis.
 2002 (31 October - 2 November), Bosco Institute for Research and Development of Youth (BIRDY), Hyderabad, Towards a new community - a violence free society.
 2006 (3–5 May), Serampore College, Serampore, Empowered by God - Women transcend barriers.
2021 (21 January) (Virtual) Observed Unity of Week Prayer with NCCI, (Speaker Rev Jyothi Sunder)
2021 (19 February) Webinar jointly with NCCI Women and Leadership: A Theological Response (Speakers: Rev Silpa Rani, Rev Dr Pearly Walter and Rev Dr Nelavala Gnana Prasuna)

Membership
Membership to ATTWI is presently restricted to those who hold a degree in theology offered by the Senate of Serampore College (University) or such other theological degrees recognised by the Senate.

ATTWI members include:
Evangeline Anderson Rajkumar
Rajula Annie Watson
Pushpa Lalitha
Elizabeth Paul
Navamani Elia Peter
B. V. Subbamma
Graham Basanti
Marathakavalli David,

Appraisal
 Wati A. Longchar, Consultant, World Council of Churches:

Publications
 Feminist Hermeneutics, Lalrinawmi Ralte, Evangeline Anderson Rajkumar, ISPCK, New Delhi, 2002, .

Executive Committees
The executive committees:

1979 
 President - Vanitha Nallathambi
 Vice-President - Nalini Arles
 Secretary - Katakshamma Paul Raj
 Treasurer - K. K. George
 Members - Shanti Solanki, Graham Basanti, Merian Mary, Principal UTC, President of AICCW, Executive Secretary of Asian Church Women's Conference

1981
 President - Saroja Moses Sangha
 Vice-President - Florence Deenadayalan
 Secretary - Sumathi Williams
 Treasurer - Susy David
 Members - Smitha Pramanik, Shantha Kumari, Vatsala Christian

1983
 President - K. K. George
 Vice-President - Christina Lall
 Secretary - Sarojini Prasad Rao
 Treasurer - Grace Bai Joseph
 Members - Nihar Nalini Chatriya, Smitha Rathod, Vimala Kantharao

1985
 President - K. K. George
 Vice-President - Christina Lall
 Secretary - Sarojini Prasad Rao
 Treasurer - Grace Bai Joseph
 Members - Nihar Nalini Chatriya, Vimala Kantharao, Sumathi Williams, Hannah Joseph, K. David, Saroja Sangha, Navamani Elia Peter, Mathai Zachariah

1987
 President - Padmasani Gallup
 Vice-President - S. A. Benjamin
 Secretary - E. Joseph
 Treasurer - S. Devapalana
 Members - S. Pramanik, Jessie Ranjan, Shanti Kumari, K. K. George, Bage

1990
 President - Navamani Elia Peter
 Vice-President - Nirmala Vasantha Kumar
 Secretary - Rajakumari Joseph
 Treasurer - Ratnavathi Babu Rao
 Members - Rachel Matthew, Manoj Manjari Kumari, Grace M. Joseph, Padmasani Gallup, Narendra John

1992
 President - Navamani Elia Peter
 Vice-President - Vijayamma Prasad
 Secretary - Florence Deenadayalan
 Treasurer - Shanta George
 Members - Suguna Devasundaram, Manoj Manjari, Awala Longkumer, Sennangshila Benjamin, P. C. Laltlani, Vidya Benjamin, Ratnavathi Babu Rao, Nirmala Susai, Shyamala Baby, Kunjamma Philip

1997
 President - Jessie Nesakumar
 Vice-President - B. V. Subbamma
 Secretary - Soumini Jayan
 Treasurer - Sabitha Swaraj
 Members - Shyamala Sukumar, Margaret Prabhu, Ida Swamidas, Anne Bhosle, Sunitha Noronha, Ashwathy John

2002
 President - Evangeline Anderson Rajkumar
 Vice-President - Annamma Thariyan
 Secretary - Pankaja Manilal
 Treasurer - Ratnavathi Babu Rao
 Members - B. Subhashini, Shanti Tilak, Graham Basanti, Christina Lall, Thankamma Varkey, Anna Mary

2006
 President - Nirmala Vasantha Kumar
 Vice-President - Susan George Matthew
 Secretary - Limatula Longkumer
 Treasurer - Krupaveni Prakasha Rao
 Members - Susan Thomas, Leela Rajanandam, Ivaleen Ammanna, Kanthamani Christopher Raj, Lovely Mukherjee, Rualzamawii, Ravi Tiwari 
2020

 President - Jyothi Sunder
 Vice-President - Hogla Thabitha
 Secretary - Nelavala Gnana Prasuna
 Treasurer - Salome Joshua
 Regional Secretaries: Kerala: Esther Reginold; Karnataka: Gracy Christian Mary; Tamil Nadu: Kirubai Kumari; Andhra Pradesh: Angel Veronica; Telangana: Vijaya Suppogu; Odissa: Anupama Hail; West Bengal: Silpa Rani; Mizoram: Boholi; Nagaland: Lalnghakthuami; Meghalaya: Pancilia Thawmuit;
 Members: Jessica Ranjan, Syamala Sukumar, Elizabeth Joseph, Senate of Serampore, BTESSC and NCCI

See also
 Elizabeth Paul
 Muriel Carder

References
Notes

Further reading

External links
 Women's Studies Department of UTC
 Women's Desk of the UELCI

Christian women's organizations
Year of establishment missing
Women's occupational organizations
Bible societies
Christian organizations established in 1979
Christian organizations established in the 20th century
Women's organisations based in India
1979 establishments in India
Affiliated institutions of the National Council of Churches in India